Von Trapp may refer to:

People
 Trapp Family, sometimes referred to as the von Trapp Family
 Agathe von Trapp, of the Trapp family (daughter)
 Georg von Trapp, of the Trapp family (father)
 Maria von Trapp, of the Trapp family (mother)
 The von Trapps, great-grandchildren of Georg and Maria von Trapp

See also
 The Sound of Music, a musical about the von Trapp family
 Von Trapp children (disambiguation)
 The von Trapp Family: A Life of Music, a 2015 German-Austrian musical drama film